"America" is a song written by Sammy Johns, and recorded by American country music artist Waylon Jennings. It was released in September 1984 as the first single from his compilation album Waylon's Greatest Hits, Vol. 2.  The song reached number 6 on the Billboard Hot Country Singles & Tracks chart.

Music video
The music video was directed by David Hogan and premiered in September 1984 on cmt. It features scenes from all across the United States. Scenes also feature Waylon Jennings singing the song outside of a convenience store at a gas station with the American flag on it.

Chart performance

References

1984 singles
1984 songs
Waylon Jennings songs
RCA Records singles
Songs written by Sammy Johns